Charles Henry Chapman (June 20, 1876 – November 17, 1934) was one of the seven founders (commonly referred to as Jewels) of Alpha Phi Alpha fraternity at Cornell University in 1906. During the organization stages of Alpha chapter, he was the first chairman of the Committees on Initiation and Organization. 

Chapman entered the field of higher education and eventually became Professor of Agriculture at what is now Florida A&M University (FAMU). During his tenure at FAMU, Chapman was a founder of the fraternity's Beta Nu chapter.

Charles Henry Chapman died on November 17, 1934, age 64, and his university funeral was held with noticeable Fraternity participation as Chapman became the first Jewel to enter Omega chapter—distinguished to contain the names of deceased fraternity members.

Citations

References

External links
Alpha Phi Alpha website

1934 deaths
Alpha Phi Alpha founders
Cornell University alumni
Place of birth missing
Place of death missing
1870 births